Wax is a class of chemical compounds and mixtures, but may also refer to:

People
Wax (surname)
Wax (rapper), an American rapper
Wax (singer), a Korean singer

Places
Wax, Kentucky
Wax Lake, Louisiana

Music
Wax (Indochine album), a 1996 album
Wax (KT Tunstall album), a 2018 album
Waxed, a 1995 album by Norwegian band Bigbang
Wax (American band), a California punk rock band
Wax (British band), a 1980s pop group featuring Andrew Gold and Graham Gouldman
Wax Ltd, a production and songwriting team of Wally Gagel and Xandy Barry

Other uses
Wax or the Discovery of Television Among the Bees, a 1991 film
Wax (Ethel Lina White novel), a 1935 mystery
Wax (cannabis), a product extracted from cannabis

See also
Debugmode Wax, a video editor
Hair wax, a type of hairstyling product
Wax argument, thought experiment
Wax gourd, a large Asian fruit
WAXX, an American radio station